Hippopotamus behemoth is an extinct species of hippopotamus from the Early Pleistocene of the Levant.  Fossils of it, the modern hippopotamus H. amphibius, and its probable ancestor, H. gorgops, are found in the ‘Ubeidiya site in the southern Levant.

H. behemoth differs from H. gorgops in having more elongated feet, and being somewhat smaller.  Some experts consider these differences to be too slight to justify separating the two species, however.

References

Extinct hippopotamuses
Pleistocene even-toed ungulates
Pleistocene mammals of Asia
Pleistocene extinctions
Fossil taxa described in 1986